Montmelon is a village and former municipality in the district of Porrentruy in the canton of Jura in Switzerland.

Since January 1, 2009 it is a part of the new municipality Clos du Doubs.

References

The municipality was composed of several villages (Montmelon-Dessus, Montmelon-dessous, Ravines) and of many dispersed farms. The municipality had approximately 100 inhabitants, many of whom are farmers.

Clos du Doubs
Former municipalities of the canton of Jura